Caribou Island is the name of several places in Canada.

Places

Ontario
There are six different islands in the province of Ontario called "Caribou Island" including:
Marie, Ontario.
 Caribou Island is the name of an island located on Big Caribou Lake in Parry Sound District.

Nova Scotia
 Caribou Island is an island in Pictou County connected to the mainland by a causeway, near the rural community of Caribou, Nova Scotia.
 Caribou Island is an island in Halifax Regional Municipality, located near the rural community of Little Harbour, Halifax, Nova Scotia.